Hadban Enzahi, foaled 15 August 1952 in El Zahraa, Egypt, and died of heatstroke on 22 July 1975, was a gray  Arabian stallion imported from Egypt, who stood at the Marbach stud in Germany. Sired by Nazeer out of Kamla,  Georg Wenzler brought him to Germany in November 1955, along with his half sister Nadya.

He sired many offspring over 19 seasons, many of which were exported worldwide and won numerous championships.

Made by German artist Ingo Koblischek, a life-size commemorative bronze statue of him stands in the grounds of Marbach Stud.

Pedigree

References

Individual Arabian and part-Arabian horses
1952 animal births
1975 animal deaths